Paul Cranage (born 16 January 1953) is a former Australian rules footballer who played with Collingwood in the Victorian Football League (VFL).

Notes

External links 

1953 births
Australian rules footballers from Victoria (Australia)
Collingwood Football Club players
Hamilton Football Club players
Living people